Ajit Kumar Bhuyan (born 1952) is a Indian politician and former journalist and author  serving as the member of Rajya Sabha from Assam since 2020 and the founder and president of Anchalik Gana Mocha since 2020.  He is also the former editor of the Asomiya Pratidin, Aji, Natun Samay, and Prag News.

Personal life
Ajit Kumar Bhuyan was born in Jorhat, India in 1952. He had his early schooling in Amguri High School, in Sibsagar district, Assam and attended college in Sibsagar College. Before he could graduate, he joined the Dainik Janambhumi, published from Jorhat, as a sub-editor. While still working as a sub-editor, he earned his BA degree from Jhanji Hemnath Sarma College, Sivasagar.

Political life 
In June 2020 Ajit Kumar Bhuyan formed a regional political party, Anchalik Gana Morcha (Regional People's Front), as its chief convenor.

He has said in a press conference after his election that Citizenship (Amendment) Act, 2019 (CAA) was the reason behind joining politics. His candidature was supported by the Indian National Congress and All India United Democratic Front. Tarun Gogoi and Badruddin Ajmal were present during his nomination. Mr Bhuyan is a fierce critic of CAA introduced and passed in the Indian parliament by the Narendra Modi led Bharatiya Janata Party Government.

References

Living people
Indian journalists
Independent politicians in India
Rajya Sabha members from Assam
1952 births